A regional election took place in Provence-Alpes-Côte d'Azur on March 21 and March 28, 2004, along with all other regions. Michel Vauzelle (PS) was elected president.

External links
Minister of the Interior (France) 2004 official results

2004 elections in France
21st century in Provence-Alpes-Côte d'Azur
 
Politics of Provence-Alpes-Côte d'Azur